The Regional Assessment Appeal Court (RAAC) is administered by the Province of Nova Scotia.

References 

Nova Scotia courts
Taxation in Canada
Canadian taxation government bodies
Property taxes